Carlos Norman Hathcock II (May 20, 1942 – February 22, 1999) was a United States Marine Corps (USMC) sniper with a service record of 93 confirmed kills. Hathcock's record and the extraordinary details of the missions he undertook made him a legend in the U.S. Marine Corps. He was honored by having a rifle named after him: a variant of the M21 dubbed the Springfield Armory M25 White Feather, for the nickname "White Feather" given to Hathcock by the North Vietnamese People's Army of Vietnam (PAVN).

Early life and education
Hathcock was born in Little Rock, Arkansas, on May 20, 1942. He grew up in Wynne, Arkansas, living with his grandmother for the first 12 years of his life after his parents separated.  While visiting relatives in Mississippi, he took to shooting and hunting at an early age, partly out of necessity to help feed his poor family. He would go into the woods with his dog and pretend to be a soldier and hunt imaginary Japanese soldiers with the old Mauser his father, Carlos Norman Hathcock (1919–1985), brought back from World War II. He hunted at that early age with a .22-caliber J. C. Higgins single-shot rifle. Hathcock dreamed of being a Marine throughout his childhood, and so on May 20, 1959, at the age of 17, he enlisted in the United States Marine Corps. Hathcock married Josephine "Jo" Bryan (née Broughton; 1930–2016) on the date of the Marine Corps birthday, November 10, 1962. Jo gave birth to a son, whom they named Carlos Norman Hathcock III.

Career
Before deploying to South Vietnam, Hathcock had won shooting championships, including matches at Camp Perry and the Wimbledon Cup. In 1966, Hathcock started his deployment in the Vietnam War as a military policeman and later became a sniper after Captain Edward James Land pushed the Marines into raising snipers in every platoon. Land later recruited Marines who had set their own records in sharpshooting; he quickly found Hathcock, who had won the Wimbledon Cup, the most prestigious prize for long-range shooting, at Camp Perry in 1965.

Confirmed kills 
During the Vietnam War, Hathcock had 93 confirmed kills of People's Army of Vietnam (PAVN) and Viet Cong personnel. In the Vietnam War, kills had to be confirmed by the sniper's spotter and a third party, who had to be an officer. Snipers often did not have a third party present, making confirmation difficult, especially if the target was behind enemy lines, as was usually the case. Hathcock himself estimated that he had killed between 300 and 400 enemy personnel during the Vietnam War.

Confrontations with North Vietnamese snipers
The PAVN placed a bounty of US $30,000 on Hathcock's life for killing so many of its soldiers. Rewards put on U.S. snipers by the PAVN typically ranged from $8 to $2,000. Hathcock held the record for the highest bounty and killed every known Vietnamese marksman who sought him to try to collect it. The Viet Cong and PAVN called Hathcock Lông Trắng, translated as "White Feather", because of the white feather he kept in a band on his bush hat. After a platoon of Vietnamese snipers was sent to hunt down "White Feather", many Marines in the same area donned white feathers to deceive the enemy. These Marines were aware of the impact Hathcock's death would have and took it upon themselves to make themselves targets in order to confuse the counter-snipers.

One of Hathcock's most famous accomplishments was shooting an enemy sniper through the enemy's own rifle scope, hitting him in the eye and killing him. Hathcock and John Roland Burke, his spotter, were stalking the enemy sniper in the jungle near Hill 55, the firebase from which Hathcock was operating, southwest of Da Nang. The sniper, known only as the "Cobra," had already killed several Marines and was believed to have been sent specifically to kill Hathcock. When Hathcock saw a glint (light reflecting off the enemy sniper's scope) in the bushes, he fired at it, shooting through the scope and killing the sniper. Hathcock took possession of the dead sniper's rifle, hoping to bring it home as a "trophy", but after he turned it in and tagged it, it was stolen from the armory.

Hathcock stated in interviews that he killed a female Viet Cong platoon leader called "the Apache woman," with a reputation for torturing captive U.S. Marines, around the firebase at Hill 55. However, scholars such as Jerry Lembcke have cast doubt on Hathcock's account and questioned the existence of "Apache".

Hathcock only once removed the white feather from his bush hat while deployed in Vietnam. During a volunteer mission days before the end of his first deployment, he crawled over 1,500 yards of field to shoot a PAVN general. He was not informed of the details of the mission until he accepted it. This effort took four days and three nights without sleep and with constant inch-by-inch crawling. Hathcock said he was almost stepped on as he lay camouflaged with grass and vegetation in a meadow shortly after sunset. At one point he was nearly bitten by a bamboo viper, but had the presence of mind to avoid moving and giving up his position. As the general exited his encampment, Hathcock fired a single shot that struck the general in the chest, killing him.

After this mission, Hathcock returned to the United States in 1967. He missed the Marine Corps, however, and returned to Vietnam in 1969, where he took command of a platoon of snipers.

Medical evacuation
On September 16, 1969, Hathcock's career as a sniper came to a sudden end along Highway 1, north of Landing Zone Baldy, when the LVTP-5 he was riding on struck an anti-tank mine. Hathcock pulled seven Marines from the flame-engulfed vehicle, suffering severe burns (some third-degree) to his face, arms, and legs, before someone pulled him away and placed him in water because he was unaware of how badly he had been burnt. While recovering, Hathcock received the Purple Heart. Nearly 30 years later, he received a Silver Star for this action. Hathcock and the seven marines he pulled from the vehicle were evacuated by helicopter to hospital ship , then to a naval hospital in Tokyo, and ultimately to the burn center at Brooke Army Medical Center in San Antonio, Texas.

After the Vietnam War
After returning to active duty, Hathcock helped establish the Marine Corps Scout Sniper School at the Marine base in Quantico, Virginia. Due to the extreme injuries he suffered in Vietnam, he was in nearly constant pain, but continued to dedicate himself to teaching snipers. In 1975, Hathcock's health began to deteriorate, and he was diagnosed with multiple sclerosis. He stayed in the Marine Corps, but his health continued to decline. Just 55 days short of the 20 years that would have made him eligible for regular retirement pay, he received a permanent disability separation. Being medically discharged, he received 100 percent disability pay. He would have received only 50 percent of his final pay grade had he retired after 20 years. He fell into a state of depression when he was forced out of the Marines because he felt as if the service had kicked him out. During this depression, his wife Jo nearly left him but decided to stay. Hathcock eventually picked up the hobby of shark fishing, which helped him to overcome his depression.

Hathcock provided sniper instruction to police departments and select military units, such as SEAL Team Six.

Later life and death
Hathcock once said that he survived in his work because of an ability to "get in the bubble", to put himself into a state of "utter, complete, absolute concentration", first with his equipment, then his environment, in which every breeze and every leaf meant something, and finally on his quarry. After the war, a friend showed Hathcock a passage written by Ernest Hemingway: "Certainly there is no hunting like the hunting of man, and those who have hunted armed men long enough and like it, never really care for anything else thereafter." He copied Hemingway's words on a piece of paper. "He got that right," Hathcock said. "It was the hunt, not the killing." Hathcock said in a book written about his career as a sniper: "I like shooting, and I love hunting. But I never did enjoy killing anybody. It's my job. If I don't get those bastards, then they're gonna kill a lot of these kids dressed up like Marines. That's the way I look at it."

Hathcock's son, Carlos Hathcock III, later enlisted in the U.S. Marine Corps; he retired from the Marine Corps as a Gunnery Sergeant after following in his father's footsteps as a shooter and became a member of the Board of Governors of the Marine Corps Distinguished Shooters Association.

Hathcock died on February 22, 1999, in Virginia Beach, Virginia, aged 56, from complications resulting from multiple sclerosis. He is buried at Woodlawn Memorial Gardens in Norfolk, Virginia.

Awards and decorations
Hathcock's awards include:

Silver Star citation

Citation:

The President of the United States of America takes pleasure in presenting the Silver Star to Staff Sergeant Carlos N. Hathcock, II (MCSN: 1873109), United States Marine Corps, for conspicuous gallantry and intrepidity in action while serving as a Sniper, Seventh Marines, FIRST Marine Division, in connection with military operations against the enemy in the Republic of Vietnam on 16 September 1969. Staff Sergeant Hathcock was riding on an Assault Amphibious Vehicle which ran over and detonated an enemy anti-tank mine, disabling the vehicle which was immediately engulfed in flames. He and other Marines who were riding on top of the vehicle were sprayed with flaming gasoline caused by the explosion. Although suffering from severe burns to his face, trunk, and arms and legs, Staff Sergeant Hathcock assisted the injured Marines in exiting the burning vehicle and moving to a place of relative safety. With complete disregard for his own safety and while suffering excruciating pain from his burns, he bravely ran back through the flames and exploding ammunition to ensure that no Marines had been left behind in the burning vehicle. His heroic actions were instrumental in saving the lives of several Marines. By his courage, aggressive leadership, and total devotion to duty in the face of extreme personal danger, Staff Sergeant Hathcock reflected great credit upon himself and the Marine Corps and upheld the highest traditions of the United States Naval Service.

Legacy
Hathcock remains a legend in the U.S. Marine Corps. The Gunnery Sergeant Carlos Hathcock Award is presented annually by the National Defense Industrial Association "to recognize an individual who ... has made significant contributions in operational employment and tactics of small arms weapons systems which have impacted the readiness and capabilities of the U.S. military or law enforcement." The Marine Corps League (MCL) sponsors an annual program with 12 award categories, which includes the Gunnery Sergeant Carlos N. Hathcock II Award presented "to an enlisted Marine who has made an outstanding contribution to the improvement of marksmanship training." A sniper range named for Hathcock is at Camp Lejeune, North Carolina.

In 1967, Hathcock set the record for the longest sniper kill. In 2002, this record was broken by Canadian snipers (Rob Furlong and Arron Perry) from the third battalion of Princess Patricia's Canadian Light Infantry during the War in Afghanistan. Hathcock was one of several individuals to utilize the M2 Browning machine gun in the sniping role. This success led to the adoption of the .50 BMG cartridge as a viable sniper round. Springfield Armory designed a highly accurized version of their M1A Supermatch rifle with a McMillan Stock and match grade barrel and dubbed it the "M-25 White Feather". The rifle had a likeness of Hathcock's signature and his "white feather logo" marked on the receiver. Turner Saddlery similarly honored Hathcock by producing a line of leather rifle slings based on his design. The slings are embossed with Hathcock's signature. On March 9, 2007, the rifle and pistol complex at Marine Corps Air Station Miramar was officially renamed the Carlos Hathcock Range Complex.

Books
Hathcock is the subject of a number of books including:

 reissued as a paperback in 1988, 
 reprinted 2001,

Weaponry
Hathcock generally used the standard sniper rifle: the Winchester Model 70 chambered for .30-06 Springfield cartridges, with the standard 8-power Unertl scope. On some occasions, however, he used a different weapon: the M2 Browning machine gun, on which he mounted an 8X Unertl scope, using a bracket made by metalworkers of the SeaBees. Hathcock made a number of kills with this weapon in excess of 1,000 yards, including his record for the longest confirmed kill at 2,500 yards (since surpassed). Hathcock carried a Colt M1911A1 pistol as a sidearm.

In popular culture
Hathcock's career as a sniper has been used as a basis for a variety of fictional snipers, from the "shooting through the scope incident" to the number of kills he made.

Film
The H2 documentary, Sniper: Inside the Crosshairs (March 10, 2015), depicted a sniper team that successfully reenacted the "through the scope" shot.
The 1993 film Sniper, starring Tom Berenger and Billy Zane, was loosely based on Hathcock's first Vietnam tour. Scenes include the "through the scope" shot, as well as the assassination of the General.
The 1998 movie Saving Private Ryan reproduced the "through the scope" shot against a German sniper.

Television
The Discovery Channel series MythBusters tested the question of shooting another sniper through his riflescope. Episode 67, entitled "Firearms Folklore" (November 29, 2006) featured the test: "Can a bullet travel through a sniper's scope and kill him?" Using a police industry standard SWAT sniper rifle and standard police match ammunition, the MythBusters fired several shots at a scoped rifle mounted on a ballistics gel dummy. The bullet was unable to hit the dummy: it was either stopped or deflected by the multiple layers of lenses in the scope, leaving the dummy relatively unharmed. Without any clear evidence that a bullet can penetrate a sniper scope, the MythBusters decided to label the myth as "busted". But, due to much debate by viewers, it was revisited in episode 75. Using a period-accurate scope (this story originates from reports of Carlos Hathcock in the Vietnam War, and the scope used by Hathcock's opponent did not have the numerous internal optical elements of the scopes tested), it was found to be plausible.
Hathcock was mentioned in the NCIS episode "One Shot, One Kill", when a white feather was found at two crime scenes where the victims were shot and killed by a sniper. The series' protagonist, Special Agent Leroy Jethro Gibbs, a former Marine scout sniper, realized the significance of the feather as the perpetrator's "calling card", referencing Hathcock's nickname during the Vietnam War ("White Feather Sniper"). He credits Hathcock with "39 confirmed kills", apparently having transposed the digits of Hathcock's actual 93 confirmed kills.
Hathcock's duel with Cobra was mentioned in the History Channel Sniper - Inside The Crosshairs in 2016. As in Mythbusters, this show also tested the question of whether shooting a sniper through his scope was possible and came to the conclusion that it was highly plausible after four shots by a modern Marine sniper.

See also

 Jack Coughlin, a retired Marine sniper with over 60 confirmed kills whose service includes Iraq and Somalia
 Richard O. Culver Jr. — worked with Land in establishing the first Marine Corps Scout Sniper School; Hathcock was Culver's Senior NCO at the school.
 Eric R. England, holds the second highest number of confirmed kills (98) for any United States Marine Corps sniper
 Chris Kyle, a Navy SEAL who holds the current record for the most confirmed kills in American military history, with 160 kills in the Iraq War, acknowledges Hathcock on page 200 of his book American Sniper
 Chuck Mawhinney, who holds the highest number of confirmed kills (103) for any United States Marine Corps sniper in history
 Adelbert Waldron, who held the record for the most confirmed kills in American military history, with 109 kills in Vietnam
 List of historically notable United States Marines

References

Sources and further reading

External links
 Marine Corps Sniper Carlos N. Hathcock, Marine Corps Heroes.
 Carlos Hathcock, Sniper Central.
 Vietnam: NVA General Sniper Takeout documentary by The History Channel.

1942 births
1999 deaths
American military snipers
Deaths from multiple sclerosis
Military personnel from Little Rock, Arkansas
Neurological disease deaths in Virginia
Purple Heart
Recipients of the Silver Star
United States Distinguished Marksman
United States Marine Corps personnel of the Vietnam War
United States Marine Corps non-commissioned officers